Keith Barber (born 21 September 1947) is an English former professional footballer best known as a player for Luton Town.

Career

After a time with Dunstable Town, Barber was signed by his home-town club Luton Town in 1970. Playing in goal for seven years, he made 142 league appearances for Luton before moving to Swansea City in 1977. After a season with Swansea, during which he was part of the side that won promotion to the Third Division, he spent a two-game loan spell at rivals Cardiff City before moving into non-League football with Bridgend Town.

References

1947 births
Living people
English footballers
Association football goalkeepers
English Football League players
Luton Town F.C. players
Swansea City A.F.C. players
Cardiff City F.C. players
Bridgend Town A.F.C. players
Dunstable Town F.C. players
Footballers from Luton